Guerilla Marketing is a 2005 Sri Lankan Sinhala action thriller film directed by Jayantha Chandrasiri and produced by K.C.K Communications for Euroshian Consultancy. It stars Yashoda Wimaladharma, Kamal Addararachchi and Sangeetha Weeraratne in lead roles along with Jackson Anthony and Sriyantha Mendis. Music composed by Premasiri Khemadasa. It is the 1050th Sri Lankan film in the Sinhala cinema.

Plot
Thisara is running an advertising agency. He has had a relationship with his cousin Suramya. But when she was away for her education he married Rangi, a young woman from a rich family. When Suramya returned after completing her education, she joins Thisara's agency, even though she is qualified to join a better firm. Suramya seems to be traditionally dressed but well talented, educated and professional while Rangi is western styled but not qualified or educated despite her richness. Presidential election is to be conducted. Two main candidates are current president (Sriyantha Mendis)and opposition leader Gregory Mahadikaram (Jackson Anthony). Thisara gets a propaganda contract from Gregory. As the main part of propaganda campaign he trains some people to spread lie rumors about Gregory's good actions, really which have never happened. He names this rumor spreading as Guerilla Marketing.
Gregory wins the election. Thisara suffers from the internal disputes within his mind about Suramya. He likes her look likes and style but he is bound by the marriage to Rangi. As a result he becomes mentally ill and admitted to mental hospital. Then Suramya reveals that though she could join a better firm, she joined Thisara's agency in order to take revenge from him for his abandonment of her and marrying another woman, in which she succeeded by dressing and appearing as he desires and giving trouble to his mind as he couldn't fulfill that desire to satisfy his eyes from his wife.
At the end scene, recovered Thisara is seen driving a vehicle in which Rangi is seated on the left seat traditionally dressed as Suramya was used to wear.

Cast
 Yashoda Wimaladharma as Suramya Mahakehelwala 
 Kamal Addararachchi as Thisara Dissanayake
 Sangeetha Weeraratne as Rangi Dissanayake
 Jackson Anthony as Gregory Mahadikaram
 Sriyantha Mendis
 Buddhadasa Vithanarachchi
 Gamini Jayalth
 Priyankara Rathnayake
 G. Ranganatha
 Palitha Galappaththi
 Mali Jayaweerage

Awards

Presidential Awards 2005 
 Jackson Anthony - Best Actor 
 Premasiri Khemadasa - Best Musical score
 Ravindra Guruge - Best Editor

SIGNIS Salutation Awards 2007 
 Jayantha Chandrasiri - Best Director Silver Award 
 Jackson Anthony - Best Actor Silver Award
 Ravindra Guruge - Best Creative Editor
 Premasiri Khemadasa - Best Creative Music Director
 Clifford Richard - Best Creative Singer

References

2005 films
2000s Sinhala-language films
Films set in Sri Lanka (1948–present)